An industrial award, sometimes known simply as an award, is a ruling in Australia handed down by either the national Fair Work Commission (or its predecessor) or by a state industrial relations commission which grants all wage earners in one industry or occupation the same minimum pay rates and conditions of employment such as leave entitlements, overtime and shift work, as well as other workplace-related conditions. The national awards, with the National Employment Standards, provide a minimum safety net of terms and conditions of employment for all national system employees. The pay rates are often called award wages or award rates.

Federal awards in Australia have been stripped back in recent years in what they are allowed to contain, in order to promote the Enterprise Bargaining Agreement system. Awards in Australia are part of the system of compulsory arbitration in industrial relations.

A similar system was also used in New Zealand prior to the Labour Relations Act 1987. New Zealand no longer uses the award system, and the only form of collective bargaining is collective agreements, which apply only to the particular unions and employers that negotiate them.

See also
Common rule awards

References

External links
 

Australian labour law
Industrial agreements